Rossocha  is a village in the administrative district of Gmina Rawa Mazowiecka, within Rawa County, Łódź Voivodeship, in central Poland.

Before World War II, it was part of a szlachta (Polish nobility) estate, belonging to Jan Czarnowski. The Czarnowski family palace was built shortly after World War I by Juliusz Nagórski.

After the war, part of the estate was turned into a biological and zoological research station.

References

 
 

Rossocha